In Broad Daylight may refer to:

 In Broad Daylight (book), a true crime book by Harry N. MacLean
 In Broad Daylight (1991 film), an American TV film, based on the book
 In Broad Daylight (1971 film), an American TV film
 In Broad Daylight (2022 film), also known as Au grand jour, a Canadian drama film